Maiadomu is an Austronesian language spoken in Milne Bay Province of Papua New Guinea.

References 

Nuclear Papuan Tip languages
Languages of Milne Bay Province